Krennerite is an orthorhombic gold telluride mineral which can contain variable amounts of  silver in the structure. The formula is AuTe2, but specimen with gold substituted by up to 24% with silver have been found ([Au0.77Ag0.24]Te2). Both of the chemically similar gold-silver tellurides, calaverite and sylvanite, are in the monoclinic crystal system, whereas krennerite is orthorhombic.

The color varies from silver-white to brass-yellow. It has a specific gravity of 8.62 and a hardness of 2.5. It occurs in high temperature, hydrothermal environments. 

Krennerite was discovered in 1878 near the village of Săcărâmb, Romania, and first described by the Hungarian mineralogist Joseph Krenner (1839–1920).

See also
List of minerals
List of minerals named after people

References

G. Tunnell and K. J. Murata, American Mineralogist 35, 359-384 (1950).
Structure of Krennerite retrieved 6-26-05
Euromineral retrieved 6-26-05

Silver minerals
Gold minerals
Telluride minerals
Orthorhombic minerals
Minerals in space group 28
Minerals described in 1878